The Iraqi Naval Forces (Arabic: القوات البحرية العراقية), or the Iraqi Navy is the naval warfare service branch of the Armed forces of Iraq. Formed in 1937, initially as the Iraqi Coastal Defense Force, its primary responsibilities was the protection of Iraq's coastline and offshore assets, the official name was changed on 12 January 2005 to Iraqi Naval Forces

As of February 2021, the navy had approximately 3,000 sailors and marines which form an Operational headquarters, five afloat squadrons, and two marine battalions.

Headed by Rear Admiral Muhammad Jawad, the navy had plans to build six Al Uboor-class patrol boats in Baghdad, with the first of the boats to enter service in September 2005. This project however, was ultimately canceled. Additionally, two Assad-class corvettes built for Iraq in the 1980s by Italy were originally planned to be delivered sometime around 2006–2007. The ships however, were found to be in a worse state than originally believed, forcing the Iraqi navy to reconsider the deal and instead buy 4, newer, smaller modified-Diciotti class vessels. The 5 British corvettes and 1 Soviet patrol boat operated by the Saddam Hussein-era Iraqi Navy were destroyed in the 1991 Gulf War and the 2003 U.S. invasion of Iraq, respectively.

The Iraqi Navy is designed for coastal water protection; preventing the smuggling of people, oil and weapons; and to protect the country's oil platforms. As a result, it mainly needs patrol boats. These may be backed up by fast attack craft. The patrol boats need to have the ability to launch rigid-inflatable boats (RIBs) for boarding ships and also possibly be able to accommodate a helicopter which would increase their patrol capability. The Iraqi Navy is building a second Marine battalion. In 2016 the Iraqi Navy awarded money to a ship maintenance company to sustain its current fleet of ships.

History

Kingdom of Iraq
The Iraqi Navy was formed in 1937 as a small four-ship force headquartered in Basra. Between 1937 and 1958, it was primarily a riverine force.

Iraqi Republic (pre-2003)

Following the 14 July Revolution of 1958, the Iraqi Navy began to expand. Operationally based in the port of Umm Qasr, the Arabic Gulf Academy for Sea Studies was established in Basra, which offered a bachelor's degree in war and engineering naval studies. By 1988, the Navy grew to a force of 5,000, but played a relatively small role during the 1980–1988 Iran–Iraq War. Much of the Navy was destroyed during Operation Pearl.

Between 1977 and 1987, the Iraqi Navy received eight s, armed with Styx anti-ship missiles, from the Soviet Union. It also purchased four s and six s from Italy, although these were never delivered because of international sanctions following the Iraqi invasion of Kuwait in 1990.

The Iraqi Navy was almost completely destroyed by the Royal Navy during the Gulf War of 1991. The force had 19 ships sunk and 6 vessels damaged. In total, more than 100 Iraqi ships were destroyed. The Navy was not rebuilt and played little part in the Iraq War (2003). One exception was two mine warfare vessels captured by US Navy and Coast Guard units during the assault on Al Faw; The tug Jumariya, towing a well camouflaged minelaying barge, and the tug Al Raya, which had been outfitted as a minelayer itself. Of the units that remained by late 2002, most were in a poor state of repair and the crews were in a poor state of readiness. Whatever units that remained after 1991 were used primarily for safeguarding Saddam's palaces on the Tigris river.

Republic of Iraq (post-2003)
In January 2004, the Iraqi Coastal Defense Force (ICDF) officially began training its first 214 volunteers.

On 30 September 2004, the ICFD assumed the responsibility of protecting the Iraqi coastline, with actual patrol operations beginning the following day, on 1 October 2004.

On 11 November 2008, Rear Admiral Muhammad Jawad signed the historic non-legally binding Khawr Abd Allah Protocols or "KAA Protocols" at the Kuwait Naval Base. The protocols were the concept of the British Royal Navy in 2008 when in command of Combined Task Force 158 operating in the northern Gulf region and specifically within Iraqi territorial waters for the protection of the Iraqi oil terminals Al Basrah Oil Terminal and in support of Iraqi maritime boundaries. They are a non-legally binding military agreement aiding deconfliction between the maritime forces of Kuwait and Iraq in the Khawr Abd Allah waterway and are reflected in a former United Kingdom Hydrographic Office chart and which was re-titled the "KAA Interoperability Admiralty Chart".

The protocols were developed, written and mediated by a British Royal Marine barrister; Lieutenant Colonel David Hammond, RM; working alongside the heads and staffs of both the Kuwaiti Navy and Iraqi Navy and which saw the historic first meeting on board a British warship  on 8 May 2008. The protocols were historically ratified and signed on 11 November 2008 at Kuwait Naval Base in the presence of Vice-Admiral William Gortney, USN; commander of the United States Naval Forces Central Command based in Bahrain and remain an enduring success story in the region highlighting co-operation and co-ordination between the two countries.

On 30 April 2010, Iraqi naval forces took over responsibility for the protection of the Khawr al-Amaya and Basra oil terminals, as well as the ports of Umm Qasr and al-Zubair.

Organization

Commands

Iraqi Naval Headquarters: Baghdad (Camp Victory).

May move to Umm Qasr.

Operational Headquarters: Umm Qasr
 Tactical Operations Center: Khawr al-Amaya Platform
 Tactical Operations Center: Al Basrah Platform

Naval Training Center: Umm Qasr
 NCO Academy
 Swiftboat Crew Training Course

Maritime Academy: Basrah

Diving Squadron: Umm Qasr

RHIBs

Patrol Squadron: Umm Qasr

PS701, PS702, PS703, PS704, PB301, PB302, PB303, and 5× U/I PBs.

Patrol Squadron: planned

Patrol Squadron: planned

Patrol Squadron: planned

Small Boat Squadron: Umm Qasr

Squadron equipped with American Defender Class boats.

Support & Auxiliary Squadron: Umm Qasr

Marines

1st Marine Brigade Special Troops Battalion: Basrah Log City

In December 2010 was redesignated 1st and moving to Basrah Log City. Reached full strength in 2011.
 1st Marine (Wolverines) Battalion: Umm Qasr
 2nd Marine Battalion: Umm Qasr/Az Zubayr
 3rd Marine Battalion: Basrah Log City
 1st Marine Bde Base Support Unit: Basrah Log City

2nd Marine Brigade Special Troops Battalion: planned

planned

Bases

Umm Qasr:

Personnel

5,400 sailors and officers, in addition to 1600 in the Iraqi Naval Battalion (marines) who guard the platforms and the port of Umm Qasr.

Ranks

Officers

Ratings

Equipment

Assad-class corvettes
A total of six ships were ordered by Iraq in the 1980s, but were never delivered as a result of the arms embargo imposed after the Gulf War in 1991. Four of the six ships were eventually purchased by the Royal Malaysian Navy in October 1995 as the Laksamana-class corvette, while the remaining two were mothballed at La Spezia.
On 19 May 2017, it was reported that the remaining two vessels would be delivered to the Iraq Navy after 26 years. They eventually left La Spezia on a semi-submersible carrier Eide Trader on 22 May and reached Iraq in June 2017.

Saettia Mk4/Fattah OPV

On 15 February 2005 the Iraqi Navy signed a $101 million contract with the Italian Government to provide four Saettia MK4 class Offshore-Patrol Vessels.

This is a modified Diciotti class offshore patrol boat, as originally used by the Guardia Costiera. The vessels are to be built by Fincantieri at Riva Trigoso, with modifications including increased crew capacity of 38. The contract also comprises the provision of logistical support and crew training with each crew completing a 7-week training course. In cooperation with the Marina Militare (Italian Navy), each commissioning crew is provided with a week’s bridge simulator course at the Academy in Livorno.

In May 2009, the first vessel, Patrol Ship 701 named Fatah (Arabic for Opening), was handed over at the Muggiano, La Spezia shipyard. The crew had been training since January 2009, and would now be heading for Umm Qasr, a 20-day/5,000 nautical miles journey via the Mediterranean, Suez Canal and Red Sea. There, additional training will be completed, before the vessel takes over duties from the British Royal Marine patrols, who will then revert to a training role of new crew. The vessels will be used to patrol the exclusive economic zone, control maritime traffic, for search and rescue and fire fighting.

Al Basra class OSV
 2 × 
 401 Al Basra
 402 Al Fayhaa

Offshore Patrol Vessels 

The fifteen (15) 35-meter Patrol Vessels (P301 – P315) were built by Swiftships in the period 2011-2014. The ships will provide logistical support for securing the oil platforms, to the Interceptor boats and more than 60 Fast Attack boats.

Predator class
The five 27-meter Predator (NHS615) Class patrol boats: (P-101), (P-102), (P-103), (P-104), (P-105); were built by Wuhan Nanhua High-speed Ship Engineering Co., Ltd. and delivered in 2002, they were to be the new ICDF's first ships and were to be purchased under the oil-for-food program. Due to their military compatibilities they were not allowed to enter Iraq until 2003. The vessel has one(1) continuous freeboard main deck with camber and slight fore sheer, one deck house and wheelhouse. The hull below main deck is divided by transversal bulkheads into 4 spaces. The speed of the vessel under sea trial conditions is 32 knots.  Crew: 14.

Supply vessels
 1 offshore supply vessel
 Al Shams (Sun):
September 2006, an Iraqi marine company will deliver a new ship (Al Shams or the Sun) which was bought from Iraqi aquatic transportation company to be employed as guiding afloat station across the sea in order. In March 2010, the Iraqi Navy awarded a USD70 million contract through FMS to RiverHawk Fast Sea Frames, LLC, Tampa, Florida for two 60-metre offshore support vessels. The two vessels were delivered on 20 December 2012.

List of fleets

Future procurement

The Iraqi Navy will reportedly be purchasing ScanEagle UAVs in the near future for maritime reconnaissance support. Exact numbers and delivery dates are still unknown as of January 2012.

See also
 Iraqi Air Force
 Iraqi Security Forces
 Iraqi Army

References

External links
 DefendAmerica News - Iraqi Navy Ships to be Built in Baghdad
 Navy League of the United States - Citizens in Support of the Sea Services
 iraqieconomy.org
 CPA-IRAQ.org: Homepage of The New Iraq - Information about the Iraqi Dinar
 David Axe – On Its Own: The Iraqi Navy in 2005 – Proceedings, August 2005
 David Axe – Resurrection – Sea Power, November 2005
 武汉南华高速船舶工程股份有限公司